Medical Reality Modeling Language (MRML) is a language implemented as a type of XML document, with new tags defined to handle medical image data types such as volumes, models or coordinate transforms.

External links
 Data modules of Slicer (software libre for visualization and image computing).

XML markup languages
Markup languages